Wilhelm Weiler (born 1 March 1936) is a Canadian gymnast. He competed in seven events at the 1964 Summer Olympics.

References

1936 births
Living people
Canadian male artistic gymnasts
Olympic gymnasts of Canada
Gymnasts at the 1964 Summer Olympics
People from Rastatt
Sportspeople from Karlsruhe (region)
Pan American Games medalists in gymnastics
Pan American Games gold medalists for Canada
Pan American Games silver medalists for Canada
Pan American Games bronze medalists for Canada
Gymnasts at the 1963 Pan American Games
Medalists at the 1963 Pan American Games
20th-century Canadian people
21st-century Canadian people